Men's shot put events for athletes with cerebral palsy were held at the 2004 Summer Paralympics in the Athens Olympic Stadium. Events were held in six disability classes.

F32

The F32 event was won by Karim Betina, representing .

19 Sept. 2004, 20:00

F33-34

The F33-34 event was won by Roman Musil, representing .

21 Sept. 2004, 18:30

F35

The F35 event was won by Guo Wei, representing .

20 Sept. 2004, 09:00

F36

The F36 event was won by Pawel Piotrowski, representing .

27 Sept. 2004, 19:00

F37

The F37 event was won by Tomasz Blatkiewicz, representing .

23 Sept. 2004, 17:00

F38

The F38 event was won by Oleksandr Doroshenko, representing .

20 Sept. 2004, 18:45

References

M